Meistriliiga (known as the A. Le Coq Premium Liiga for sponsorship reasons) is the highest division of the Estonian Football Association annual football championship. The league was founded in 1992, and was initially semi-professional with amateur clubs allowed to compete. With the help of solidarity mechanisms, the league is fully professional since the 2020 season.

As in most countries with low temperatures in winter time, the season starts in March and ends in November. Meistriliiga consists of ten clubs, all teams play each other four times. After each season the bottom team is relegated and the second last team plays a two-legged play-off for a place in the Meistriliiga.

In February 2013, A. Le Coq, an Estonian brewery company, signed a five-year cooperation agreement with the Estonian Football Association, which included Meistriliiga naming rights.

Meistriliiga plans to start using video assistant referee (VAR) from 2023.

2023 season
The following 10 clubs will compete in the 2023 Meistriliiga.

a = Founding member of the Meistriliiga 
b = Played in every Meistriliiga season 
c = Never been relegated from the Meistriliiga

Champions

Total titles won

All-time Meistriliiga table
The table is a cumulative record of all match results, points and goals of every team that has played in the Meistriliiga since its inception in 1992. The table that follows is accurate as of the end of the 2021 season. Teams in bold play in the Meistriliiga 2022 season. Numbers in bold are the record (highest) numbers in each column.

In this ranking 3 points are awarded for a win, 1 for a draw, and 0 for a loss, although Meistriliiga awarded 2 points for a win until the 1994–95 season. Championship matches, relegation matches and relegation tournament matches involving clubs of lower leagues are not counted. In 1992 Preliminary Round matches were played in two groups. The results of the matches played between teams in same group were taken to second round, thus counted twice, in this table these results are counted once.

The table is sorted by all-time points.

Notes
Note 1: 1999–2003 FC Levadia Maardu, 2004– FC Levadia. Not to be confused with FC Levadia Tallinn 2001–2003 a separate team owned by the steel company Levadia. In 2004 the clubs were merged FC Levadia Maardu were moved to Tallinn and became FC Levadia, former FC Levadia Tallinn became their reserves as FC Levadia II.
Note 2: 1992 TVMV, 1995–1996 Tevalte-Marlekor, 1996–1997 Marlekor, 1997–2008 TVMK
Note 3: 1992 Viljandi JK, 1993– Viljandi Tulevik
Note 4: 1992–2005 Merkuur, 2006 Maag
Note 5: 1992–1993 Vigri, 1993–1995 Tevalte, 1996–1999 Vigri
Note 6: 2000–2003 Kohtla-Järve Lootus, 2004 Alutaguse Lootus, 2005–2012 Kohtla-Järve Lootus, then merged and became Kohtla-Järve JK Järve
Note 7: 1992 Tartu Kalev, 1992–1994 EsDAG, 1994– DAG
Note 8: 1992 Pärnu JK, 1994–1996 PJK Kalev
Note 8: 2011–2016 Infonet, 2017 FCI Tallinn

Records
All as of end of 2022 season if not stated otherwise.

Club records
Most seasons in the Meistriliiga: 32 – Flora and Narva Trans (all seasons, 1992–present)
Most consecutive seasons in the Meistriliiga: 32 – Flora and Narva Trans (all seasons, 1992–present)
Most titles: 14 – Flora
Most consecutive titles: 4 – Levadia (2006–2009)
Biggest title-winning margin: 21 points – 2009; Levadia (97 points) over Sillamäe Kalev (76 points)
Smallest title-winning margin: 0 points – 1993–94; Flora and Norma both finished on 36 points, Flora won the title in a championship play-off match 5–2.
Most points in a season: 97 – Levadia (2009), Flora (2022)
Fewest points in a season: 0 – Maardu (1992)
Most wins in a season: 31 – Levadia (2009, 36 games), Flora (2022, 36 games)
Fewest wins in a season: 0 – PJK/Kalev (1995–96, 14 games), Vall (1996–97, 14 games), Lelle (1998, 14 games), Ajax (2011, 36 games), Tarvas (2016, 36 games)
Most consecutive wins: 17 – Norma (15 May 1992 – 2 October 1993)
Most defeats in a season: 33 – Tarvas (2016, 36 games)
Most consecutive matches undefeated: 61 – Levadia (10 May 2008 – 7 November 2009)
Most goals scored in a season: 138 – TVMK (2005)
Most goals per game in a season: 4.636 – Norma (1992–93, 102 goals in 22 games)
Fewest goals scored in a season: 11 – Sillamäe Kalev (1993–94, 22 games), Valga (2000, 28 games), Kuressaare (2003, 28 games), Lootus (2004, 28 games), Ajax (2011, 36 games)
Fewest goals per game in a season: 0.306 – Ajax (2011, 11 goals in 36 games)
Most goals conceded in a season: 192 – Ajax (2011, 36 games)
Fewest goals conceded in a season: 16 – Levadia (2010, 36 games)
Most clean sheets in one season: 24 – Levadia (2014)
Most consecutive clean sheets: 13 – Levadia (2014)
Biggest win: Tevalte 24–0 Sillamäe Kalev (27 May 1994)
Most hat-tricks in a season: 9 – Norma (1992–93)

Player records

Most appearances:
As of 12 November 2022. Active players in bold.

Most goals:
As of 12 November 2022. Active players in bold.

Oldest player: Boriss Dugan – 51 years and 153 days (for Ajax v. Tammeka, 5 November 2011)
Youngest player: Patrik Kristal – 14 years and 245 days (for FCI Levadia v. Tammeka, 15 July 2022)
Oldest goalscorer: Sergei Zamogilnõi – 43 years and 16 days (for Eesti Põlevkivi v. Vall, 15 September 1996)
Youngest goalscorer: Martin Vetkal – 15 years and 261 days (for Tallinna Kalev v. Tulevik, 9 November 2019)
Most goals in a season: 46 – Aleksandrs Čekulajevs (for Narva Trans, 2011)
Most goals in a match: 10 – Anatoli Novožilov (for Tevalte v. Sillamäe Kalev, 27 May 1994)
Most consecutive matches scored in: 15 – Tor Henning Hamre (for Flora, 2003)
Most hat-tricks: 22 – Vjatšeslav Zahovaiko
Most goals from the penalty spot: 55 – Konstantin Nahk
Fastest goal: 12 seconds – Aleksander Saharov (for Flora v. Lootus, 29 August 2004)
Fastest own goal: 5 seconds – Jaanis Kriska (for Levadia v. Kuressaare, 12 September 2009)
Fastest hat-trick: 5 minutes – Vjatšeslav Zahovaiko (for Flora v. Lootus, 18 October 2004)
Most clean sheets in one season: 24 – Roman Smishko (for Levadia, 2014)
Longest consecutive run without conceding a goal: 13 games (1,281 minutes) – Roman Smishko (for Levadia, 5 April 2014 – 25 July 2014)

Estonian champions

 1921Sport Tallinn (1)
 1922Sport Tallinn (2)
 1923Kalev Tallinn (1)
 1924Sport Tallinn (3)
 1925Sport Tallinn (4)
 1926Jalgpalliklubi Tallinn (1)
 1927Sport Tallinn (5)
 1928Jalgpalliklubi Tallinn (2)
 1929Sport Tallinn (6)
 1930Kalev Tallinn (2)
 1931Sport Tallinn (7)
 1932Sport Tallinn (8)
 1933Sport Tallinn (9)
 1934Estonia Tallinn (1)
 1935Estonia Tallinn (2)
 1936Estonia Tallinn (3)
 1937–38Estonia Tallinn (4)
 1938–39Estonia Tallinn (5)
 1939–40Olümpia Tartu (1)
 1941 Not finished
 1942PSR Tartu (1) (unofficial)
 1943Estonia Tallinn (6) (unofficial)
 1944 Not finished

Bold indicates club's first championship victory.

Estonian SSR champions

1945Dünamo Tallinn
1946Balti Laevastik Tallinn
1947Dünamo Tallinn
1948Balti Laevastik Tallinn
1949Dünamo Tallinn
1950Dünamo Tallinn
1951Balti Laevastik Tallinn
1952Balti Laevastik Tallinn
1953Dünamo Tallinn
1954Dünamo Tallinn
1955Kalev Tallinn
1956Balti Laevastik Tallinn
1957Kalev Ülemiste
1958Kalev Ülemiste
1959Kalev Ülemiste
1960Balti Laevastik Tallinn
1961Kalev Kopli
1962Kalev Ülemiste
1963Tempo Tallinn
1964Norma Tallinn
1965Balti Laevastik Tallinn
1966Balti Laevastik Tallinn
1967Norma Tallinn
1968Balti Laevastik Tallinn
1969Dvigatel Tallinn
1970Norma Tallinn
1971Tempo Tallinn
1972Balti Laevastik Tallinn
1973Kreenholm Narva
1974Baltika Narva
1975Baltika Narva
1976Dvigatel Tallinn
1977Baltika Narva
1978Dünamo Tallinn
1979Norma Tallinn
1980Dünamo Tallinn
1981Dünamo Tallinn
1982Tempo Tallinn
1983Dünamo Tallinn
1984Estonia Jõhvi
1985Kalakombinaat/MEK Pärnu
1986Zvezda Tallinn
1987Tempo Tallinn
1988Norma Tallinn
1989Zvezda Tallinn
1990TVMK Tallinn
1991TVMK Tallinn

 Balti Laevastik was a Baltic Fleet club
 Zvezda Tallinn was a Tallinn garrison club
 Dvigatel means Motor/Engine

References

External links
Official website
Estonia - List of Champions at the Rec.Sport.Soccer Statistics Foundation website

 
1
Estonia
Summer association football leagues
Estonian Football Championship
1921 establishments in Estonia
1944 disestablishments in Estonia
1992 establishments in Estonia